Tavira is a Portuguese wine region centered on the Tavira Municipality in the Algarve region. The region has Portugal's highest wine classification as a Denominação de Origem Controlada (DOC). Extending to the Spanish border, the region is flanked on the west by the Lagoa DOC.

Grapes
The principal grape varietals of the Tavira region include Crato Branco, Negra Mole and Periquita.

See also
List of Portuguese wine regions

References

Wine regions of Portugal
Portuguese products with protected designation of origin